Andrei Vladislavovich Bagin (born 18 April 1996) is a Russian ice dancer. With his former partner, Annabelle Morozov, he is the 2019 CS Golden Spin of Zagreb silver medalist.

Personal life 
Bagin was born on 18 April 1996 in Moscow, Russia. His grandfather, Leonid Khachaturov, is the Chairman of the Coaching Council of the Figure Skating Federation of Russia (FFKKR).

Career

Early years 
Bagin started learning to skate in 2006. He began training in ice dancing in 2008, at the age of 12, and competed with his first partner, Kristina Baklanova, for six seasons. Based in Moscow, the two were coached by Larisa Filina before switching to Alexander Zhulin and Oleg Volkov. They debuted on the ISU Junior Grand Prix series in September 2012, finishing 8th in Istanbul, Turkey. A year later, they placed fourth at a JGP event in Košice, Slovakia. It was their final international event together.

Bagin teamed up with his second partner, Eva Khachaturian, in 2014. They trained together for two seasons under Zhulin and Volkov in Moscow and finished fourth at two JGP events.

In 2016, Bagin moved up to the senior ranks, partnered with Maria Stavitskaia. They placed 8th at the 2017 Russian Championships and 12th at the 2017 Winter Universiade before parting ways. Later that year, Bagin teamed up with Annabelle Morozov. The two decided to train under her father, Nikolai Morozov, in Moscow.

2017–2018 season 
Morozov/Bagin only competed domestically during the 2017–18 season and placed eighth at the 2018 Russian Figure Skating Championships.

2018–2019 season 
Morozov/Bagin made their international and Grand Prix debut during the 2018–19 season by receiving the Russian host pick slot at the 2018 Rostelecom Cup. The couple placed ninth at the event. Later in the season, Morozov/Bagin went on to compete at the 2018 CS Tallinn Trophy and the 2018 CS Golden Spin of Zagreb, where they placed seventh and eighth, respectively. The team completed their season at home at the 2019 Russian Figure Skating Championships, where they again finished eighth.

2019–2020 season 
Morozov/Bagin began their season at the 2019 CS Ice Star, where they placed third in the rhythm dance but later fell to fourth in the free dance and fourth overall. Nevertheless, the team set new personal bests in all three segments at this event. At their next competition, the 2019 CS Golden Spin of Zagreb, Morozov/Bagin made their first international podium, placing second in both the rhythm dance and the free dance to win the silver medal overall. The team again set new personal bests in all three segments and surpassed their previous best total score by over 13 points.

In December 2019, Morozov/Bagin earned their highest placement to date at the 2020 Russian Figure Skating Championships, finishing just off the podium in fourth behind bronze medalists Zahorski/Guerreiro.

2020–2021 season 
Morozov/Bagin started the season at the senior Russian test skates. Competing on the domestic Cup of Russia series, they won silver in the first stage in Syzran and gold in the second stage in Moscow.  They competed on the Grand Prix at the 2020 Rostelecom Cup, where they placed fourth in the rhythm dance. They dropped to fifth place after the free dance.

With defending national champions Sinitsina/Katsalapov sitting out the 2021 Russian Championships due to COVID-19 infection, the bronze medal position on the podium was widely perceived as a close contest among several teams, Morozov/Bagin among them.  However, they performed poorly in the rhythm dance, with Bagin first stumbling in the Finnstep pattern dance segment, and then both falling in the step sequence.  As a result, they placed seventh in the rhythm dance, 15.66 points behind fifth-place Shevchenko/Eremenko and 18.02 points behind Skoptcova/Aleshin in third.  They placed third in the free dance, partly due to errors from teams ahead, but due to the wide deficit from the rhythm dance, they rose only to sixth place overall.  Morozov said afterward that while it had been difficult to perform after such a difficult first day, "I just tried to forget about yesterday, and we are very pleased with how we performed today."

Following the national championships, Morozov/Bagin participated in the 2021 Channel One Trophy, a televised team competition held in lieu of the cancelled European Championships.  They were selected for the Red Machine team captained by Alina Zagitova.  They placed fourth in both their segments of the competition, while their team finished first overall.

2021–2022 season 
Morozov and Bagin had previously been contemplating a free dance based on Nikolai Rimsky-Korsakov's Scheherazade, but had put away the idea after the onset of the pandemic. They revived the concept for the 2021–22 season, Morozov noting that they hoped "the way we portray the characters and even costume-wise and movements" were "a little bit different" from the famous free dance of Americans Davis/Charlie White. They made their season debut at the 2021 Skate America, where they placed fifth. They went on to finish sixth at the 2021 Internationaux de France.

At the 2022 Russian Championships, Morozov/Bagin finished fourth, 0.10 points behind bronze medalists Khudaiberdieva/Bazin.

Morozov/Bagin ended their partnership in March 2022. On 17 May 2022, it was announced that Bagin had teamed up with Sofya Tyutyunina, coached by Alexander Zhulin.

Programs

With Tyutyunina

With Morozov

With Baklanova

Competitive highlights 
GP: Grand Prix; CS: Challenger Series; JGP: Junior Grand Prix

With Tyutyunina

With Morozov

With Stavitskaia

With Khachaturian

With Baklanova

Detailed results
Small medals for short and free programs awarded only at ISU Championships. At team events, medals awarded for team results only. ISU personal bests highlighted in bold.

With Morozov

References

External links 

 

1996 births
Living people
Russian male ice dancers
Figure skaters from Moscow
Competitors at the 2017 Winter Universiade